In music, Op. 96 stands for Opus number 96. Compositions that are assigned this number include:

 Beethoven – Violin Sonata No. 10
 Dvořák – String Quartet No. 12
 Raff – Symphony No. 1
 Schumann – Lieder und Gesänge volume IV
 Shostakovich – Festive Overture
 Weinberg – Requiem